Josée Auclair (born May 20, 1962 in Sherbrooke, Quebec) is a Canadian explorer.

She lives with her husband Richard Weber and their two sons, Tessum and Nansen, in the Outaouais region of Quebec, Canada. Josée started cross-country skiing at the age of ten and began competing at fourteen. She was a member of Canada's National Cross Country Ski Team and represented Canada at international championships, mostly in Sweden and Germany. Between 1979 and 1982, she won four national titles in 5 km and 7.5 km competitions and, during her years at the University of Vermont, was a member of the relay team which won many honours.

On five occasions between 1999 and 2004, Josée skied to the North Pole as part of the "last degree expeditions" organised by Canadian Arctic Holidays, the Arctic expeditions and adventure company she operates with her husband. She acted as the assistant-guide on four of these expeditions but in April 2001 she became expedition leader of the very first all-women team to ski to the North Pole from a Russian base. In 2006, Josée was back in the expedition leader role for a group of 9 people heading from the North Pole to Ward Hunt Island at the northern tip of Ellesmere Island, Nunavut Canada. On April 27, the group managed to reach latitude 88 50′. However, bad ice conditions endangered their safety and they had to be evacuated and brought back to the Borneo drifting station. In January 2007, Josée set foot in Antarctica for the very first time as a team of four women called upon her to be their expedition leader for a last degree expedition to the South Pole. She is therefore the first Canadian woman to have guided expeditions at both poles.

Josée has traveled extensively in the Arctic since 1988 and has assisted her husband Richard and his partner Mikhail (Misha) Malakhov on several of their expeditions. She has actively participated in preparing and outfitting four major expeditions to the North Pole. Richard and Josée have over 20 years of experience and more than 45 Arctic expeditions to their credit (13+ of them to the North Pole). They are very well known across the Canadian Arctic, particularly in Nunavut. They are leaders in tourism and specialists in North Pole and northern logistics.

The Weber-Auclair family also operates Arctic Watch, Canada's most northerly lodge located in Cunningham Inlet on Somerset Island in Nunavut.

Degrees

 Bachelor's degree in botany from the University of Vermont
 Teaching certificate from the Université du Québec

North Pole expeditions

South Pole expedition

Other Arctic expeditions

Awards

See also
List of female sportspeople
List of polar explorers

External links
 Arctic Watch and Canadian Arctic Holidays
 Canadian Arctic Holidays Website
 Beluga Haven
 South Pole Expedition 2007
 South Pole Trek 2007 Website
 Women Quest 2001
 Women on the Edge
 Women team up for North Pole trek
 Other
 Arctic outfitters call for adventure safety rules

1962 births
Canadian explorers
Explorers of the Arctic
Living people
People from Sherbrooke
Female polar explorers